KKDS-LP (97.7 FM) is a radio station broadcasting to the Eureka, California area. It serves the Eureka area. The station is currently owned by Dell' Arte, Inc.

See also
List of community radio stations in the United States

External links
 

KDS-LP
KDS-LP
Community radio stations in the United States
Mass media in Humboldt County, California